Boris Yevhenovych Lozhkin (born on October 23, 1971, in Kharkiv, Ukraine) is a Ukrainian businessperson and philanthropist. He is the President of the Jewish Confederation of Ukraine, Vice-president of the World Jewish Congress, First Vice-president of the Euro-Asian Jewish Congress.

Business activity
He founded a small media company in 1994. It eventually grew into one of the largest multimedia businesses in Eastern Europe. UMH Group's portfolio encompassed internet, radio, and print, including the local rights to Forbes and Vogue. It was the first and only Ukrainian media group to be listed on the Frankfurt Stock Exchange. The company, which had been valued at around $400 million, was sold in 2013.

Public activity 
In 2016, Boris resumed his entrepreneurial activities and expanded his philanthropic efforts. He has been focusing high-growth investments in Ukraine and internationally. He also served for a year as the pro bono Secretary of the National Investment Council to attract foreign investment in Ukraine.

Lozhkin was elected President of the Jewish Confederation of Ukraine in 2018, and appointed vice-president of the World Jewish Congress.

References

1971 births
Living people
Politicians from Kharkiv
Businesspeople from Kharkiv
Ukrainian Jews
Ukrainian mass media owners
Head of the Presidential Administration of Ukraine